Baruch Maman (born 1955) is an Israeli former footballer. He is considered one of the best players to emerge from the ranks of the youth team of Maccabi Haifa.

Biography
He was born in Safed to a Tunisian-Jewish family, they moved to Haifa when he was three.

Sports career
Joining the youth ranks at Maccabi Haifa at the  age of 14, he enjoyed reasonable success on the Under-21 side scoring 12 goals in six matches. Before his draft into the Israel Defense Forces, he played his first team match against Hapoel Tel Aviv.

He  played for the Israeli Air Force football team in an IDF tournament.

In 1982, Jack Mansell arrived to coach Maccabi Haifa. Despite his efforts to replace Maman out,  Yochanan Vollach fought on his behalf and Maman went on to become a starring member of the team, helping Maccabi Haifa win its first championship in 1984 and retaining this title in 1985.

References

External links
  Profile and biography of Baruch Maman on Maccabi Haifa's official website

1955 births
Living people
Israeli footballers
Maccabi Haifa F.C. players
Bnei Yehuda Tel Aviv F.C. players
Hapoel Tiberias F.C. players
Footballers from Haifa
Israeli people of Tunisian-Jewish descent
Liga Leumit players
Israel international footballers
Association football midfielders
Israeli football managers
Hapoel Haifa F.C. managers
Maccabi Ironi Kiryat Ata F.C. managers